The Sahelian tiny shrew (Crocidura pasha) is a species of mammal in the family Soricidae. It is found in Ethiopia and Sudan. Its natural habitat is dry Sahel savanna.

References
 Hutterer, R. 2004.  Crocidura pasha.   2006 IUCN Red List of Threatened Species.   Downloaded on 30 July 2007.

Crocidura
Mammals of Ethiopia
Mammals of Sudan
Sahel
Mammals described in 1915
Taxonomy articles created by Polbot